Parliamentary elections were held in Sudan between 13 November 1981 and 15 January 1982. The People's Assembly had been reduced from 368 to 151 seats, of which 138 were elected and 13 were appointed by President Gaafar Nimeiry.

At the time, the Sudanese Socialist Union was the sole legal party, and it won all 151 seats.

Results

References

Sudan
Sudan
Parliamentary election
Parliamentary election
Elections in Sudan
One-party elections
National Legislature (Sudan)
Election and referendum articles with incomplete results
November 1981 events in Africa
January 1982 events in Africa